The Presidential Standard of France refers to either one of two similar flags used by the President of France. Two versions of the flag exist, one for use on land; and the other for use at sea.

Although almost universally called a standard, such flags when used in France are banners of arms, as they comprise the shield. However, that is not the case for the national emblem. Since 1995, the President had used the standard without any symbols on it.

The Presidential Standard is flown at the Élysée Palace, La Lanterne and Fort de Brégançon even when the president is not present.

When Philippe Pétain was chief of state of Vichy France, the Presidential Standard was adorned with the Order of the Francisque. Charles de Gaulle used a cross of Lorraine on the Presidential Standard as a symbolism of Free France. Valéry Giscard d'Estaing had the Presidential Standard with the fasces and François Mitterrand had the Presidential Standard with a oak tree.

Presidential standards

Historic

Uses of Standards

The Presidential Standard is reserved only for the president, and is the most used. Those with a white tie signals the presence of the president at a residence, and is also used on official vehicles, but also on other road vehicles at home or abroad. The Presidential Standard is also flown from aircraft and water vessels. When the president is aboard a French naval ship, the flag is flown from the main mast of the ship and is lowered upon his/her departure. The flag is also draped over the coffin of the President upon his/her death.

See also

 Flag of France

References

 
Presidents of France
France